William Channing Gibbs (February 10, 1787February 21, 1871) was the tenth Governor of Rhode Island from 1821 to 1824.

Early life
Gibbs was born in Newport, Rhode Island, the son of George Gibbs and Mary Channing. He served in the state militia, rising to the rank of major general.

Family
Governor Gibbs was married to Mary Kane, with whom he had ten children.

One daughter, Sarah Gibbs, married Robert Means Thompson, a naval officer, business executive and president of the American Olympic Association.   Thompson also served as the Commander-in-Chief of the Military Order of the Loyal Legion of the United States.

His son, Theodore K. Gibbs (born in 1840), served in the Union Army during the American Civil War. He was commissioned a 2nd lieutenant in the 1st Artillery in October 1861 and was promoted to 1st lieutenant in February 1862.  He received brevets (honorary promotions) to the ranks of captain and major for gallantry in action at the battles of Olustee, Florida and Cold Harbor, Virginia respectively.  He was a companion of the Massachusetts Commandery of the Military Order of the Loyal Legion of the United States.  He resigned from the Army in May 1870 and lived in New York City and Newport, Rhode Island until his death in 1909.

Another son, Eugene Beauharnais Gibbs (born in 1833), served as a captain in the 2nd California Infantry during the Civil War.  After the war, he was commissioned as a 2nd lieutenant the 8th Infantry in the Regular Army, rose to the rank of captain, and served until his death in 1882.

Political career
He was a representative in Rhode Island's General Assembly from 1816 to 1820. He served as governor from May 2, 1821, to May 5, 1824.

During the three terms that he was governor, the state ballot held the question of expanding suffrage, but it was constantly rejected. In his last term, a Constitutional Convention drafted a document about voting rights irregularities, nevertheless, no changes to the State Constitution were accepted by the voters.

Gibbs died on February 21, 1871, at the age of 84 and is buried in the Island Cemetery in Newport with his wife and his son Theodore Kane Gibbs.

References

External links

Robert Means Thompson  http://www.suvcw.org/mollus/pcinc/rmthompson.htm
National Governors Association Bio
Genealogy

1787 births
1871 deaths
Governors of Rhode Island
Rhode Island Democratic-Republicans
Politicians from Newport, Rhode Island
Burials in Rhode Island
Democratic-Republican Party state governors of the United States
19th-century American politicians